Saluda Lake is a   reservoir formed by a spillway from the uppermost dam on the Saluda River in South Carolina, United States. The lake was constructed in 1905 for the purpose of creating hydroelectric power. Duke Power Company formerly owned the lake then sold it to North Brook Energy, LLC.

See also
List of lakes in South Carolina

References

Protected areas of Greenville County, South Carolina
Protected areas of Pickens County, South Carolina
Saluda
Bodies of water of Greenville County, South Carolina
Bodies of water of Pickens County, South Carolina